Processual archaeology (formerly, the New Archaeology) is a form of archaeological theory that had its beginnings in 1958 with the work of Gordon Willey and Philip Phillips, Method and Theory in American Archaeology, in which the pair stated that "American archaeology is anthropology, or it is nothing" (Willey and Phillips, 1958:2), a rephrasing of Frederic William Maitland's comment: "My own belief is that by and by, anthropology will have the choice between being history, and being nothing." The idea implied that the goals of archaeology were, in fact, the goals of anthropology, which were to answer questions about humans and human culture. That was a critique of the former period in archaeology, the cultural-history phase in which archaeologists thought that any information that artifacts contained about past people and past ways of life would be lost once the items became included in the archaeological record. All they felt could be done was to catalogue, describe, and create timelines based on the artifacts. (Cultural Historical Theory disregards the material record, and instead focuses solely on ideas of how culture could have developed, not caring if there is proof of these ideas in the archaeological record. Processual Archaeology argues that ideas and theories mean nothing without any ability to prove them, so it applied the scientific method to archaeology, emphasizing the need for objectivity when looking at the material record, to ensure that what they find is replicable.)

Proponents of the new phase in archaeology claimed that the rigorous use of the scientific method made it possible to get past the limits of the archaeological record and to learn something about how the people who used the artifacts lived. Colin Renfrew, a proponent of the new processual archaeology, observed in 1987 that it focuses attention on "the underlying historical processes which are at the root of change". Archaeology, he noted, "has learnt to speak with greater authority and accuracy about the ecology of past societies, their technology, their economic basis and their social organization. Now it is beginning to interest itself in the ideology of early communities: their religions, the way they expressed rank, status and group identity."

Theory

The theoretical frame at the heart of processual archaeology is cultural evolutionism.  Processual archaeologists are, in almost all cases, cultural evolutionists.  It is from this perspective that they believe they can understand past cultural systems through the remains they left behind.  This is because processual archaeologists adhere to Leslie White's theory that culture can be defined as the exosomatic (outside the body) means of environmental adaptation for humans. In other words, they study cultural adaptation to environmental change rather than the bodily adaptation over generations, which is dealt with by evolutionary biologists. This focus on environmental adaptation is based on the cultural ecology and multilinear evolution ideas of anthropologists such as Julian Steward.  As exosomatic adaptation, culture is determined by environmental constraints. The result of this is that processual archaeologists propose that cultural change happens within a predictable framework and seek to understand it by the analysis of its components.   Moreover, since that framework is predictable, then science is the key to unlocking how those components interacted with the cultural whole. What this all means to processual archaeologists is that cultural changes are driven by evolutionary "processes" in cultural development, which will be adaptive relative to the environment and therefore not only understandable, but also scientifically predictable once the interaction of the variables is understood.  Thus one should be able to virtually completely reconstruct these "cultural processes."  Hence came the name "processual archaeology".  Its practitioners were also called "new archaeologists".

Methodologically, the advocates of the New Archaeology had to come up with ways of analyzing the archaeological remains in a more scientific fashion.  The problem was that no framework for this kind of analysis existed.  There was such a dearth of work in this area that it led Willey and Phillips to state in 1958, "So little work has been done in American archaeology on the explanatory level that it is difficult to find a name for it". Different researchers had different approaches to this problem.  Lewis Binford felt that ethno-historical information was necessary to facilitate an understanding of archaeological context. Ethno-historical (history of peoples) research involves living and studying the life of those who would have used the artifacts - or at least a similar culture.  Binford wanted to prove that the Mousterian assemblage, a group of stone artifacts from France during the ice age, was adapted to its environment, and so Binford spent time with the Nunamiut of Alaska, a people living in conditions very similar to those of France during the period in question.  Binford had a good deal of success with this approach, and though his specific problem ultimately eluded complete understanding, the ethno-historical work he did is constantly referred to by researchers today and has since been emulated by many.

The new methodological approaches of the processual research paradigm include logical positivism (the idea that all aspects of culture are accessible through the material record), the use of quantitative data, and the hypothetico-deductive model (scientific method of observation and hypothesis testing).

During the late 1960s and into the 1970s, archaeologist Kent Flannery began championing the idea that Systems theory could be used in archaeology to attack questions of culture from an unbiased perspective.  Systems theory has proved to be a mixed bag for archaeology as a whole.  It works well when trying to describe how elements of a culture interact, but appears to work poorly when describing why they interact the way that they do.  Nevertheless, Systems Theory has become a very important part of processualism, and is perhaps the only way archaeologists can examine other cultures without interference from their own cultural biases.

As an instance, in the field of paleolinguistics, Colin Renfrew, in re-examining Proto-Indo-European language and making a case for the spread of Indo-European languages through neolithic Europe in connection with the spread of farming, outlined three basic, primary processes through which a language comes to be spoken in a specific area: initial colonization, replacement and continuous development. From some obvious reasoning he proceeded to some radically new conclusions.

Further theoretical development

In 1973, the processualist David Clarke of Cambridge University would publish an academic paper in Antiquity claiming that as a discipline, archaeology had moved from its original "noble innocence" through to "self-consciousness" and then onto "critical self-consciousness", a symptom of which was the development of the New Archaeology. As a result, he argued, archaeology had suffered a "loss of innocence" as archaeologists became sceptical of the work of their forebears. Clarke's paper would later be described as "one of the seminal statements of the New Archaeology, by one of its leading proponents" in Britain, if not elsewhere, by the archaeologists Caroline Malone and Simon Stoddart.

Processualism's development transformed archaeology, and is sometimes called the "New Archaeology."  With few notable exceptions such as Boston University, universities in America classify archaeology as a sub-discipline of anthropology, while in Europe it is thought to be a subject more like historical studies. It is important to analyze which sciences are close kin because such analysis highlights the questions of what archaeology ought to study and in what ways. Like the other social scientists, the New Archaeologists or processualists wanted to utilize scientific methodology in their work. Archaeology, and in particular archaeology of the historical period, has sometimes been allied more with humanities disciplines such as Classics. The question of where to put archaeology as a discipline, and its concomitant issues of what archaeology ought to study and which methods it ought to use, likely played no small part in the emergence of post-processualism in Europe.

Legacy

In his 2010 book on archaeological theory, Matthew Johnson- then of the University of Southampton, now at Northwestern University- argued that despite the intervening 40 years since its development, the "intellectual questions" first posed by processualism remained "absolutely central" to archaeology.

Criticism
Processual archaeologist David L. Clarke suggested that the New Archaeology would face particular opposition from amateurs, historical archaeologists and practical excavators but argued that such individuals would still benefit from the theory's adoption.

Processualism began to be critiqued soon after it emerged, initiating a theoretical movement that would come to be called post-processualism. Post-processualist critics consider the main weaknesses of processual archaeology:
environmental determinism
lack of human agency
view of cultures as homeostatic, with cultural change only resulting from outside stimuli
failure to take into account factors such as gender, ethnicity, identity, social relations etc.
supposed objectivity of interpretation

Writing in 1987, the archaeologist Christopher Chippindale of Cambridge University spoke on the view of processualism at that time, putting it in the context of the 1960s, when he stated that:

The sharper students of the current generation reasonably regard the "New Archaeology" in its pristine form as a period piece, as strange an artefact of that remote era as the Paris évènements or Woodstock. They have some cause: the then-radical insistence that nothing valuable had been written in archaeology before 1960 matched the hippie belief that anyone over 30 was too ancient to be intelligent, and the optimism that anything could be recovered from the archaeological record if only you searched hard enough was the archaeological version of the hope that the Pentagon could be levitated if only enough people had sufficient faith.

Notes

Footnotes

Bibliography

References

Binford, Lewis R.
1962. "Archaeology as anthropology". In Contemporary Archaeology, ed by M. Leone, pp. 93–101. Southern Illinois University, Carbondale.
1965. "Archaeological systematics and the study of culture process". In American Antiquity 31(2) Part 1: 203-210.
Binford, Sally R. & Lewis Binford.
1968. New Perspectives in Archaeology. Chicago, Aldine Press.
Trigger, Bruce.
1989. A History of Archaeological Thought. Cambridge University Press: New York
1984. Alternative Archaeologies: nationalist, colonialist, imperialist. Man 19(3): 355–370.
Watson, Patty J.
1991. "A Parochial Primer:  the New Dissonance as Seen from the Midcontinental United States".  In Processual and Postprocessual Archaeologies, ed. by Preucel, Robert W, pp. 265–274.  Center for Archaeological Investigations.
White, Leslie A.
1959. The Evolution of Culture. McGraw-Hill, New York.
Willey, Gordon R., and Philip Phillips.
1958.  Method and Theory in American Archaeology.  Univ. of Chicago Press, Chicago.

Further reading
 Balter, Michael. The Goddess and the Bull: Catalhoyuk, An Archaeological Journey to the Dawn of Civilization (2005) for a detailed account of the debate between the processual and post-processual schools of archaeology.

Archaeological theory